Sholom Rokeach (1781 – September 10, 1855), also known as the Sar Sholom ("Angel of Peace"), was the first Belzer Rebbe.

To Belzer Hasidim, he is known as "Der Ershter Rov" (the first rabbi), but in the city of Belz itself he was called "Der Alter Rov" (the old rabbi) in deference to the Bach, who presided as rabbi of Belz in the sixteenth century.

Biography
His father was Rabbi Eleazar Rokeach, one of the sages of the kloyz of Brody. The latter was the grandson of Rabbi Eleazar, author of Maaseh Rokeach, rabbi of Brody until 1736, then Chief Rabbi of Amsterdam.

His mother was Rebbetzin Rivka Henna Ramraz.

After Rabbi Eleazar died at the age of 32, Rivka Henna lived in Brody with her five orphaned children. She sent her son Sholom, around 11 years old at the time, to be raised by her brother, Rabbi Yissachar Dov Ramraz, rabbi of Skohl, then in Galicia. Later on, he married Rabbi Yissachar Dov's daughter, Malka (1780 – 23 August 1853). They had five sons and two daughters. According to Czech writer Jiří Langer, who moved to Belz in 1913 and began collecting anecdotes about Rokeach a half-century after his death, Reb Sholem was so devoted to his “excellent wife” that “contrary to the custom of all devout men he even ate at the same table with her.”

In the town of Skohl, Rokeach was influenced by Rabbi Shlomo Flam, also known as the Rebbe of Skohl (also known as Reb Shlomo Lutzker), who served as the private scribe and right-hand man of Rabbi Dov Ber of Mezeritch, the successor to the Baal Shem Tov, founder of Hasidism. Since Reb Sholem’s uncle (and father-in-law) was opposed to Hasidism, Rokeach would secretly leave the house night after night (with the tacit but unspoken blessing of his ambitious wife), in order to meet his [unnamed] male companion, who had previously been Sholem’s partner in a failed business venture, but had come to share Sholem’s sleepless passion for Torah study. Rather than leave each night through the front door, where his male companion waited outside, Sholem would climb out of an upper room window each evening, descending with a ladder, “so that no jealous soul should know of it”.

It was in this way, according to Belzer legend, that over the course of nine hundred and ninety-nine nights, excepting the Sabbath (perhaps), Sholem and his companion were able to learn the word of G-d, all through the dark hours without a wink of sleep, in Rabbi Shlomo Lutzker's otherwise empty Beis Hamidrash. On the thousandth night, during a “terrible storm with heavy rain, hail, and thunder”, the Devil himself barred their way into the edifice: profoundly frightened, Sholem’s study companion fled, returning that evening to his home and the company of his wife. But the “dauntless Sholem” somehow managed to enter the Belz House of Study, and did not study alone that fateful evening, for he was joined by the prophet Elijah “and the spirits of saints who had long since died”, who were said to have initiated him “in the way Heaven rewards perseverance” by giving him keys to the celestial gates and full insight into the Kabbalic Mysteries. Thus Reb Sholem was turned into a saint that fateful night, it is said, while “his companion remained an ordinary human being.”

Rokeach was also a disciple of the Seer of Lublin, who (in Sholem’s own words) “taught me to read in each person’s kvitel [which were frequently brought to Reb Sholem for his prayer and personal intercession] where the roots of his soul are, in Adam, Cain, or Abel, how many times his soul has been reincarnated, what transgression he has committed to bring about this or that reincarnation, what harm he has done, what vice has taken root in him and what merit has been added to him. He also taught me to recognize which constellations are favorable when one prays for this or that, and which not.”

He composed several songs, most of them still sung by the Belzer Hasidim, including one niggun (melody) to Tzur Mishelo sung during the Shalosh Seudot (third Shabbat meal).

Many of his teachings are preserved in an anthology entitled Midbar Kodesh.

He reigned as Rebbe from 1817 (when he became rabbi in Belz) until his death in 1855. In addition to leading his Hasidim, he defended the beleaguered Jews of his district to the governor. In a famous exchange, the governor of the district invited him to his office and said, "Do you know that I am the second Haman?" The Sar Sholom replied, "Luck was not on the side of the first one, either". The governor was so impressed by the Rebbe's firm stand that he promised to put an end to the Jewish persecution.

He built a four-story synagogue in Belz which was inaugurated in 1843. It had a capacity of 5,000.

Although it was uncommon in the early Hasidic movement for a son to succeed his father as Rebbe (typically the Rebbe or leader would be succeeded by a disciple), the Sar Shalom wished to be succeeded by the youngest of his five sons, Yehoshua.

Rebbes of Belz
 Rabbi Sholom Rokeach (1781–1855)
 Rabbi Yehoshua Rokeach (1825–1894)
 Rabbi Yissachar Dov Rokeach (1854–1926)
 Rabbi Aharon Rokeach (1877–1957)
 Rabbi Yissachar Dov Rokeach (b. 1948)

Disciples of Rabbi Sholom
Disciples of Rabbi Sholom include: Rabbis Shlomo Kluger, Chaim Halberstam, Moshe Teitelbaum, Zadok HaKohen, Asher of Stolin, and Yehoshua of Lezsno (Lechno).

See also
Agudat Israel
Belz (town in Poland/Ukraine)
Belz Great Synagogue

Notes

1779 births
1855 deaths
Jews from Galicia (Eastern Europe)
Polish Hasidic rabbis
Hasidic rabbis in Europe
Rebbes of Belz